Kossa Bokchan (January 1, 1925 in Berlin – November 21, 2009 in Belgrade) was a Serbian painter who lived in Paris. She married Petar OmAiikus (Pierre Omcikous).

Education
In 1928, when Bokchan was three, her parents moved to Belgrade. During World War II, as a teen, she studied painting with Mladen Josić and in 1944, at the studio of Zora Petrović. Afterwards, Bokchan enrolled at the Academy of Fine Arts in Belgrade, in the class of Ivan Tabaković. Others in the class included, Petar Omčikus (Bokchan's future husband), Mića Popović, Bata Mihailović, Vera Božičković, Ljubinka Jovanović and Mileta Andrejević.

Career
In 1947, Bokchan joined a post-war Yugoslav art commune, Zadarska grupa (Zadar's group). Bokchan first exhibited her work in 1950. Her first solo exhibition was 1952. Bokchan then moved to Paris with Petar Omčikus. She made Paris her home and had her first exhibition there in 1954. From 1960, she made regular summer trips to Vela Luka on Korčula. Bokchan has exhibited in Lille, Paris, Strasbourg, Rome, Nancy, Novi Sad, Niš, Zagreb, Skopje and Titograd. The Museum of Contemporary Art in Belgrade held a Bokchan retrospective in 2001. From 5 March 2010 to 27 April 2010, the Serbian cultural centre in the Latin quarter of Paris held a Bokchan retrospective. Bokchan was also published as an illustrator.

Art
Kossa Bokchan's painting has changed over time. One early stage was her transition from socialist realism to genres outside that dogma such as landscapes and portraits. This was evident in her first exhibition. She also moved away from genres taught at the Academy which she described as "still life and skeletons". Bokchan's style belongs to the school of expressive realism. Her move to Paris began her stylistic journey towards contemporary art trends, especially geometric and lyrical abstraction and from there towards the informal. After 1961, Bokchan returned to realism as determined by 'The Paris School'. Michel Ragon, art historian, suggested this was a type of abstract naturalism. Bokchan's art is also influenced by the Byzantine tradition. Bokchan transforms mythical symbols into artistic expression.

Awards
1968 Ministry of Culture and Communication, Paris
2000 Special Award on VI International Biennial of Miniature Art, Gornji Milanovac

Bibliography (selection)
Jean-Clarence Lambert, Actualité, Opus international, No 8, Paris, 1968
Georges Boudaille, 'Yougoslave 68', rendez-vous international, Les lettres françaises, No 1248, s. 24-27, Paris, 1968
Jeanine Warnod, Grâce a un mécénat populaire, une petite île yougoslave crée la ville de la mosaïque, Le Figaro, Paris, 1968
Georges Boudaille, Le Salon de Mai 1969, Les lettres françaises, No 1284, s. 21-27, Paris, 1960
Jeanine Warnod, Rencontre d'artistes à Vela Luka, Le Figaro, Paris, 1970
Jean Senac, Les fermes solaires de Kossa Bokchan, Opus international, No 18, s. 19-20, Paris, 1970
Gerald Gassiot Talabot, Vela Luka actualités, Opus international, No 21, s. 53-56, Paris, 1970
Gerald Gassiot Talabot, Sur une île dalmate, Annales, Paris, 1970
Joseph Ryckwert, La Bienalle de Vela Luka suit isola di curzola Yugoslavia, Domus, No 491, Milano, 1970
Georges Boudaille, Giorgio di Genova, Galleria 'il Grifo (pref) Rome, 1974
Anne Tronche, 'Face a Femmes', (pref), Le Havre, 1978
Georges Boudaille, Anne Tronche, (pref), Nancy, 1995

References

Sources
 Museum of Contemporary Art, Belgrade
 Kosara Bokšan, a retrospective exhibition catalog, Museum of Contemporary Art, Belgrade, 2001

1925 births
2009 deaths
20th-century Serbian painters
Serbian women artists
Serbian women painters
20th-century women artists